Ohio Township is one of twenty-five townships in Bureau County, Illinois, USA. As of the 2020 census, its population was 814 and it contained 396 housing units. Ohio Township changed its name from Richland Township in June 1850.

Geography

Villages
 Ohio

Unincorporated towns
 Kasbeer

Cemeteries
 Ohio
 Union

Major highways
  Illinois Route 26
  Illinois Route 92

Airports and landing strips
 Albrecht Airport
 Zea Mays Field

Demographics
As of the 2020 census there were 814 people, 381 households, and 267 families residing in the township. The racial makeup of the township was 93.24% White, 0.37% African American, 0.25% Native American, 0.61% Asian, 0.12% Pacific Islander, 0.37% from other races, and 5.04% from two or more races. Hispanic or Latino of any race were 2.70% of the population.

There were 381 households, out of which 24.90% had children under the age of 18 living with them, 40.68% were married couples living together, 22.31% had a female householder with no spouse present, and 29.92% were non-families. 26.20% of all households were made up of individuals, and 16.00% had someone living alone who was 65 years of age or older. The average household size was 2.36 and the average family size was 2.73.

The township's age distribution consisted of 17.6% under the age of 18, 8.2% from 18 to 24, 23.1% from 25 to 44, 30% from 45 to 64, and 21.1% who were 65 years of age or older. The median age was 45.5 years. For every 100 females, there were 92.6 males. For every 100 females age 18 and over, there were 90.8 males.

The median income for a household in the township was $60,268, and the median income for a family was $61,771. Males had a median income of $44,783 versus $20,043 for females. The per capita income for the township was $32,995. About 0.7% of families and 8.8% of the population were below the poverty line, including none of those under age 18 and 10.2% of those age 65 or over.

School districts
 Ohio Consolidated Grade School District 17
 Ohio Community High School District 505

Political districts
 Illinois's 16th congressional district
 State House District 74
 State Senate District 37

References
 
 US Census Bureau 2007 TIGER/Line Shapefiles
 US National Atlas

External links
 City-Data.com
 Illinois State Archives

Townships in Bureau County, Illinois
Populated places established in 1849
Townships in Illinois
1849 establishments in Illinois